The FrOSCon (FRee and Open Source CONference) is an annual conference organized by the Bonn-Rhein-Sieg University of Applied Sciences and the FrOSCon E.V. The FrOSCon features a variety of lectures and workshops on free and open source software. The event takes place regularly at the end of August since 2006. It is considered one of the largest events of this kind in Europe and the largest in Germany, with the Chemnitzer Linux Days being second.

A large range of speakers are part of the scene. Organizational work is done solely by volunteers. Since 2014 the FrOSCon E.V. decided not to charge anything for admission.

Topics 

The FrOSCon has covered a wide array of topics over the years.

External links 
 

Free-software conferences